John Roberts served his first and only full year on the United States Court of Appeals for the District of Columbia Circuit in 2004. The following are opinions written by Judge Roberts in 2004.

References

Case law lists by judge